The Kootenay Lake ferry is a ferry across Kootenay Lake in southeastern British Columbia, which operates between Balfour, on the west side of the lake, and Kootenay Bay, on the east side. The MV Osprey 2000 and the MV Balfour are the two vessels used.

The route is the longest free scenic ferry carrying vehicles in the world. The elimination of fares on the Tancook Island ferry in June 2021, made it the longest free passenger ferry route.

Sternwheeler era
A number of companies operated ferries on the lake from the 1890s. When the Canadian Pacific Railway completed a rail link between Procter and Kootenay Landing in 1930, sternwheeler service on the southern arm of the lake ended. In 1931, the BC government chartered the SS Nasookin for the Main Lake crossing between Fraser's Landing and Gray Creek. The government acquired the vessel in 1933, modifying the upper decks for the route.

Balfour–Kootenay Bay

In 1947, the terminals were relocated to Balfour and Kootenay Bay. Launched in 1946, the 40-vehicle, 150-passenger capacity MV Anscomb served the route until 2000. In 1960, the superstructure was raised to increase truck clearance. In 1972, the vessel was stripped to the car deck and completely rebuilt. In 2004, the decommissioned vessel sank while moored for renovations.

The 28-vehicle, 150-passenger capacity MV Balfour was launched in 1954. After the October 1963 opening of the Salmo–Creston highway over the  Kootenay Pass, ferry fares were eliminated the following month. Built by Kootenay Ferry Builders at Nelson, the 80-vehicle, 250-passenger capacity MV Osprey 2000  was launched and entered service in 2000. Since 2004, Western Pacific Marine has been the service contractor.

The free ferry operates under contract to the British Columbia Ministry of Transportation and Infrastructure. A single vessel sails throughout the year, with ten departures from Balfour between 6:30am and 9:40pm, returning from Kootenay Bay between 7:10am and 10:20pm. The second vessel runs in summer only, providing an extra five crossings in either direction. The Osprey 2000 normally handles the main service, while the smaller Balfour usually provides the additional summer sailings.

In 2021, a realignment of Upper Balfour Road to eliminate a steep slope was completed, and a new washroom building was erected at the Balfour Terminal. Under construction by Western Pacific Marine at Nelson, the 55-vehicle capacity replacement for the Balfour is designed with both diesel and electric motors. Scheduled to enter service in 2024, the vessel will more than double the vessel capacity and will be fully converted to electric propulsion by 2030.

See also
Adams Lake Cable ferry
Arrow Park ferry
Barnston Island Ferry
Big Bar Ferry
Francois Lake ferry
Glade Cable ferry
Harrop Cable Ferry
Lytton Ferry
Little Fort Ferry
McLure Ferry
Needles Ferry
Upper Arrow Lake Ferry
Usk Ferry

Footnotes

References

External links
Western Pacific Marine website Contractor that operates the ferry

Connecting the Kootenays: The Kootenay Lake Ferries

Ferries of British Columbia
Crossings of the Kootenay River